Tom Bean Independent School District is a public school district based in Tom Bean, Texas (USA).

In addition to Tom Bean, the district also serves the community of Luella.

In 2009, the school district was rated "recognized" by the Texas Education Agency.

Schools
Tom Bean High School (Grades 9-12)
Tom Bean Middle School (Grades 6-8)
Tom Bean Elementary School (Grades K-5)

References

External links
 

School districts in Grayson County, Texas